All Saints' Church is a Grade II listed parish church in the Church of England in Eaton, Nottinghamshire.

History

The church was rebuilt 1860 in Steetley stone by G. Shaw of Manchester for H. Bridgeman Simpson of Babworth Hall. The south chancel wall however contains a 15th-century piscina.

Organ

The church contains a small pipe organ of 4 stops.

Bell 
There is one bell hung for swing chiming in the bell cote.

Group of Churches 
This church is one of the churches that makes up the Elkesley Group. The churches are:
All Saints', Eaton
St Peter, Gamston
St Paul, West Drayton
St Giles, Elkesley
Our Lady & St Peter, Bothamsall

The group was under the care of a Lay Worker who was installed at Elkesley, St Giles on Thursday 5 February 2015.

References

Church of England church buildings in Nottinghamshire
Grade II listed churches in Nottinghamshire
Churches completed in 1860
Bassetlaw District